Caladenia interjacens, commonly known as the Walpole spider orchid is a species of orchid endemic to the south-west of Western Australia. It has a single, hairy leaf and one or two pale pink and white flowers which lack the red tip on the labellum common to many other similar caladenias.

Description 
Flowering occurs from September to late October.

Taxonomy and naming 
Caladenia interjacens was first described in 2001 by Stephen Hopper and Andrew Phillip Brown from a specimen collected in the Walpole-Nornalup National Park and the description was published in Nuytsia. The specific epithet (interjacens) is a Latin word meaning "intervening" or "coming between" referring to the characteristics of the flowers of this species being intermediate between those of Caladenia longicauda and C. huegelii.

Distribution and habitat 
The Walpole spider orchid occurs between Walpole and West Cliff Point in the Jarrah Forest and Warren biogeographic regions where it grows in woodland and in low coastal heath.

Conservation
Caladenia interjacens is classified as "Priority Four" by the Government of Western Australia Department of Parks and Wildlife, meaning that is rare or near threatened.

References

External links 

interjacens
Orchids of Western Australia
Endemic orchids of Australia
Plants described in 2001
Endemic flora of Western Australia
Taxa named by Stephen Hopper
Taxa named by Andrew Phillip Brown